Prokofyeva (Russian: Ostrov Prokofyeva) is a small island in the Sea of Okhotsk. It is one of the Shantar Islands. It lies to the northeast of Bolshoy Shantar Island.

History
 
Prokofyeva was frequented by American whaleships cruising for bowhead whales between 1855 and 1885.

Fauna

In the spring and summer there is a small nesting colony of thick-billed murre on the island.

References

Shantar Islands
Islands of the Sea of Okhotsk
Islands of the Russian Far East
Islands of Khabarovsk Krai